Midas are a Japanese progressive rock band which was formed in Osaka in 1983.

History 
Their debut album Beyond The Clear Air was released in 1988 and was well received abroad. In 2009, they released the album 25th Anniversary Concert & Early Rare Tracks, which was accompanied by a re-release of their first album, to celebrate their 25th anniversary.

Members
Eigo Utoh – violin, guitar, vocals
Eisho Lynn – keyboards
Izumi Takeda – bass, pedal synthesizer, vocal
Masaru Henmi – drums, percussion

Discography
Beyond the Clear Air (1988)
Midas II (1996, MARQUEE Bell Antique)
Third Operation (1999, MARQUEE Bell Antique)
international popular album　(2000, King Records)
In Concert (2002, MARQUEE Bell Antique)
25th Anniversary Concert & Early Rare Tracks　(2009, Musea Records)
Beyond the Clear Air (2009 re-release, Musea Records)
Touch the Clear Air (2013, MARQUEE Bell Antique)
Eternal Voyage (2017, MARQUEE Bell Antique)

External links 
 MIDAS official site
 MIDAS    on MUSEA
 MIDAS  on BIG BANG
 MIDAS on YouTube

Japanese progressive rock groups
Symphonic rock groups
Musical groups from Osaka
Musical groups established in 1983
Musea artists